Chocolatier: Decadence by Design is a casual strategy video game, developed by Big Splash Games LLC and published by PlayFirst. The game was released on January 22, 2009 for the Mac OS X and Windows. In 2011 it was released on the iOS platform. In Chocolatier: Decadence by Design, players are able to create their own chocolate by combining ingredients and designing their own chocolate. It is the third video game in the Chocolatier series.

Gameplay and plot

Introduction

The game begins with a movie titled "Chocolatier: Decadence by design, a brief history of Baumeister confection" The movie explains the history of Baumeister confection. About 100 years ago, Hierynomous Baumeister built a small shop in Sydney, Australia to support his father's, Marten, chocolate invention. A few years later the confection was a success and became the world's chocolate household, but the company was divided thanks to family squabbles. Sisters Evangeline and Rowena managed to reconcile and rebuild the company, but by the roaring 20's, the company is in decline again. Evangeline's granddaughter, Alexandra Tangye uses secret ingredients and fresh recipes to turn things around, but the company is broken up once more because of the depressing second world war. Chocolate factories all over the world are either converted into a weapon factory or abandoned, plus Alex's husband, Sean Fletcher disappeared during an airplane mission.

Rebuilding

Alex is now giving the players a chance to rebuild the great company and become its leader. Players will start at Zurich, Switzerland where Alex will give out missions in order to become a CEO candidate.

Endorsements

She later explains that in order to become CEO, players must earn endorsement from five different board members (Felix Baumeister, Deiter Baumeister, Evangeline Baumeister, Joseph Tangye, and Whitney Baumeister). The ports to these board members unlock one by one after each member gives an endorsement. Players must achieve a few conditions given by the board member (example: recipe requirements, cash in hand, and shops ownership) in order to receive an endorsement. To meet these conditions, players must finish a number of quests given by random people and/or board members.

Secret laboratory

After becoming a CEO candidate, players gain access to a secret tasting laboratory located in Reykjavik. In the secret lab, players can create their own chocolate recipes using the ingredients slot, after combining ingredients players will earn a feedback from Teddy Baumeister. After hearing the feedback, players can choose to continue designing the chocolate or go back and choose more suitable ingredients.

Continuing

The players can design the chocolate shape and colors they can also name it and gave a description. After creating the recipe, players can manufacture it and start selling it on shops, keep in mind that in order to create recipes players must have an empty slot in the "Creations" section in the recipe book. The slot can be earned by continuing their success in the chocolate world. In the third game, players will be able to not only manufacture series of chocolates, but also coffees. Coffee come in two forms: Coffee and Coffee blends, in order to manufacture coffee players must buy certain coffee beans that matches the recipes.

Purchases

Players can purchase ingredients all over the world, some of the market sells mostly sugars and cacao beans. Certain ingredients and beans are only available in certain places in the world, for example the Kona coffee beans can only be purchased at the plantation in Hawaii. Ingredients can also be rewarded to players if they finish certain quest, example: finishing Bianca Rabiti's quest will earn players a few sacks of honey.

Minigames
There are four different minigames in Chocolatier: Decadence by design:
Making Chocolates: Players must shoot out ingredients into the correct tray. If all five tray is filled correctly, players will receive five case/week. If the players match the available tray colours, they'll receive production bonus. But if they missed eight ingredients, production will be halted. This minigame is available on any factory that's equipped with a chocolate machine (Bars, infusions, truffles, or exotics)
Making Coffees: Players must shoot out ingredients into the conveyor belt to perform a three in a row. If they managed to do four in a row or more, they'll receive a production bonus. But if they missed eight ingredients, production will be halted. This minigame is available on any factory equipped with a coffee machine (Coffee or coffee blends)
Slot Machine: First, players choose their wager (the amount is determined by their net worth) there are three wagers: x100, x1000, or x10000 (example: 400, 4000, and 40000) after choosing wagers, players can pull down the slot machine handle. If their machine shows a winning row, they'll receive money. This minigame is available only in Havana and Las Vegas casino.
Mystery Box:First, players choose their wager. After choosing wagers they may open mystery boxes, these boxes are filled with money, but three of them are filled with a "Whammy" If players found a whammy, their bet and extra earnings from opening boxes is taken. They can choose to quit at any time (even if their earnings doesn't reach the original bet) This minigame is available only in the Havana and Las Vegas casino

Reviews
Slide to Play rated the game as a "Must have" and praise its twist on the empire building genre.

References

2009 video games
Business simulation games
Games built with Playground SDK
Lua (programming language)-scripted video games
IOS games
MacOS games
Video games about food and drink
Video games developed in the United States
Video games set in Switzerland
Windows games
PlayFirst games